The 2011 International German Open was the 105th edition of the International German Open, a men's tennis tournament held that year in Hamburg, Germany. Part of the ATP World Tour 500 series of the 2011 ATP World Tour, the games would last from 18 July through 24 July 2011.
Andrey Golubev was the defending champion, but lost to Philipp Kohlschreiber in the first round.

Gilles Simon won in the final 6–4, 4–6, 6–4, against Nicolás Almagro.

Seeds
All seeds received a bye into the second round.

Qualifying

Draw

Finals

Top half

Section 1

Section 2

Bottom half

Section 3

Section 4

External links
 Main draw

International German Open - Singles
2011 International German Open